Denmark competed at the 1988 Summer Olympics in Seoul, South Korea. 78 competitors, 57 men and 21 women, took part in 73 events in 15 sports.

Medalists

Competitors
The following is the list of number of competitors in the Games.

Archery

After two Olympiads without competing in archery, Denmark returned to the sport in 1988.  Three men competed, placing 11th as a team and no higher than 23rd as individuals.

Men's Individual Competition:
 Henrik Toft — 1/8 final (→ 23rd place)
 Jan Jacobsen — Preliminary round (→ 25th place)
 Niels Gammelgaard — Preliminary round (→ 56th place)

Men's Team Competition:
 Toft, Jacobsen, and Gammelgaard — Semifinal (→ 11th place)

Athletics

Men's 1,500 metres
Mogens Guldberg

Men's Marathon 
 Henrik Jørgensen 
 Final — 2:16.40 (→ 22nd place)

Men's 110 metres Hurdles
Erik Jensen

Men's Decathlon 
 Lars Warming — 7859 points (→ 19th place) 
 100 metres — 11.07s
 Long Jump — 7.04m
 Shot Put — 13.41m
 High Jump — 1.94m
 400 metres — 47.97s
 110m Hurdles — 14.49s
 Discus Throw — 40.38m
 Pole Vault — 4.80m
 Javelin Throw — 51.50m
 1.500 metres — 4:22.41s

Women's Long Jump
Lene Demsitz

Boxing

Men's Flyweight (– 51 kg) 
Johnny Bredahl
 First Round — Lost to Hamed Halbouni (SYR), RSC-2

Men's Light-Welterweight
Søren Søndergaard

Men's Light-Middleweight
Johnny de Lima

Men's Light-Heavyweight
Niels Madsen

Men's Heavyweight
Claus Børge Nielsen

Canoeing

Cycling

Nine cyclists, eight men and one woman, represented Denmark in 1988. Dan Frost won gold in the points race.

Men's road race
 Tommy Nielsen
 Peter Meinert Nielsen

Men's 1 km time trial
 Kenneth Røpke

Men's individual pursuit
 Peter Clausen

Men's team pursuit
 Peter Clausen
 Dan Frost
 Jimmi Madsen
 Lars Olsen
 Ken Frost

Men's points race
 Dan Frost

Women's road race
 Karina Skibby — 2:00:52 (→ 42nd place)

Equestrianism

Judo

Modern pentathlon

One male pentathlete represented Denmark in 1988.

Men's Individual Competition:
 Tue Hellstem — 4940pts (→ 27th place)

Men's Team Competition:
 Hellstem — 4940pts (→ 21st place)

Rhythmic gymnastics

Rowing

Sailing

Men

Women

Open

Shooting

Swimming

Men's 50m Freestyle
 Vagn Høgholm
 Heat — 23.50 (→ did not advance, 20th place)
 Peter Rohde
 Heat — 23.70 (→ did not advance, 26th place)

Men's 100m Freestyle
 Franz Mortensen
 Heat — 50.74
 B-Final — 51.05 (→ 13th place)
 Peter Rohde
 Heat — 51.38 (→ did not advance, 25th place)

Men's 200m Freestyle
 Franz Mortensen
 Heat — 1:51.15
 B-Final — 1:51.44 (→ 13th place)
 Jan Patvel Larsen
 Heat — 1:53.61 (→ did not advance, 31st place)

Men's 400m Freestyle
 Claus Christensen
 Heat — 4:00.46 (→ did not advance, 31st place)

Men's 100m Backstroke
 Lars Sørensen
 Heat — 58.01 (→ did not advance, 21st place)

Men's 200m Backstroke
 Lars Sørensen
 Heat — 2:05.73 (→ did not advance, 26th place)

Men's 100m Breaststroke
 Lars Sørensen
 Heat — 1:06.30 (→ did not advance, 47th place)

Men's 200m Breaststroke
 Christian Toft
 Heat — DSQ (→ did not advance, no ranking)

Men's 100m Butterfly
 Benny Nielsen
 Heat — 54.52
 B-Final — 54.77 (→ 11th place)

Men's 200m Butterfly
 Benny Nielsen
 Heat — 1:59.26
 Final — 1:58.24 (→  Silver Medal)
 Jan Patvel Larsen
 Heat — 2:03.01 (→ did not advance, 23rd place)

Men's 4 × 100 m Freestyle Relay
 Franz Mortensen, Vagn Høgholm, Benny Nielsen, and Peter Rohde
 Heat — 3:25.15 (→ did not advance, 10th place)

Men's 4 × 200 m Freestyle Relay
 Franz Mortensen, Claus Christensen, Jan Patvel Larsen, and Peter Rohde
 Heat — 7:33.31 (→ did not advance, 11th place)

Men's 4 × 100 m Medley Relay
 Lars Sørensen, Christian Toft, Benny Nielsen, and Franz Mortensen
 Heat — 3:51.97 (→ did not advance, 14th place)

Women's 50m Freestyle
 Gitta Jensen
 Heat — 26.61 (→ did not advance, 20th place)

Women's 100m Freestyle
 Gitta Jensen
 Heat — 57.28 (→ did not advance, 20th place)
 B-Final — 57.02 (→ 13th place)
 Pia Sørensen
 Heat — 57.82 (→ did not advance, 26th place)

Women's 200m Freestyle
 Mette Jacobsen
 Heat — 2:01.80
 B-Final — 2:01.84 (→ 11th place)
 Annette Jørgensen
 Heat — 2:04.71 (→ did not advance, 24th place)

Women's 400m Freestyle
 Eva Mortensen
 Heat — 4:18.06 (→ did not advance, 20th place)
 Pernille Jensen
 Heat — 4:20.96 (→ did not advance, 26th place)

Women's 800m Freestyle
 Pernille Jensen
 Heat — 8:50.82 (→ did not advance, 18th place)
 Eva Mortensen
 Heat — 8:53.67 (→ did not advance, 22nd place)

Women's 200m Breaststroke
 Pia Sørensen
 Heat — 2:38.49 (→ did not advance, 25th place)

Women's 200m Butterfly
 Mette Jacobsen
 Heat — 2:15.78
 B-Final — 2:15.60 (→ 13th place)

Women's 200m Individual Medley
 Annette Poulsen
 Heat — 2:21.83 (→ did not advance, 20th place)

Women's 400m Individual Medley
 Annette Poulsen
 Heat — 4:54.01
 B-Final — 4:54.40 (→ 15th place)

Women's 4 × 100 m Freestyle Relay
 Mette Jacobsen, Gitta Jensen, Pia Sørensen, and Annette Jørgensen
 Heat — 3:48.83
 Gitta Jensen, Pia Sørensen, Mette Jacobsen, and Annette Jørgensen
 Final — 3:49.25 (→ 8th place)

Women's 4 × 100 m Medley Relay
 Mette Jacobsen, Pia Sørensen, Annette Jørgensen, and Gitta Jensen
 Heat — DSQ (→ did not advance, no ranking)

Tennis

Women's Singles Competition
 Tine Scheuer-Larsen
 First Round — Defeated Warda Bouchabou (Algeria) 6–0, 6–1 
 Second Round — Defeated Wendy Turnbull (Australia) 6–4, 6–3 
 Third Round — Lost to Natasha Zvereva (Soviet Union) 1–6, 2–6

Weightlifting

References

Nations at the 1988 Summer Olympics
1988
Summer Olympics